Sokolov Mykhaylo Volodymyrovych (Ukrainian: Соколов Михайло Володимирович) (born 27 November 1967, in Dnipro, Ukraine) is a Ukrainian politician, People's Deputy of Ukraine of the VI convocation.

Biography 
In 1985, he graduated from the high school No.67 with a mathematical profile. In 1991, he graduated from Oles Honchar Dnipro National University with a speciality Mechanical Engineer of Spacecraft.

From 1991 to 1997 he worked as a master design engineer at Yuzhmash (Production Association Yuzhny Machine-Building Plant).

From 1997 to 1999 Sokolov worked as deputy director of Ukr-farm. In 1999–2000, he served as a deputy director of Optimafarm. Sokolov's career continued at the Evist enterprise, where he also worked as a deputy director until 2005. He was the director of development of the enterprise SDS. For the next three years, until October 2007, he was the head of Technopharma.

In 2001, Sokolov initiated a program of providing Dnipro city with drinking water, got the Diploma International Academic Rating of Popularity and Quality Gold Fortune, Nominee for The Best Project award.

In 2002, he began his political career, and he was elected twice as a deputy of the Dnipro City Council.

Social and political activity 
From 2002 to 2007, Sokolov served as a deputy of the Dnipro City Council of IV-V convocations. During his being a deputy, he was one of the initiators who created a program to provide accessible drinking water to Dnipro by initiating the creation of open auctions for the sale of land lease rights.

In 2004–2012, he was the President of the Association for the Promotion of Cinematography in Ukraine.

From November 23, 2007, to December 12, 2012, he was a Member of Parliament of Ukraine of the VI convocation (Batkivshchyna All-Ukrainian Union), Member of the Committee on Justice, member of the Special Control Committee on Privatization (December 2007).

In 2008–2009, as a Member of Parliament, he participated in the abolition of the visa regime between Ukraine and the State of Israel. In February 2013, on behalf of the United Opposition he created the human rights NGO All-Ukrainian Commission of Justice together with the People's Deputies of Ukraine. He was elected chairman of this commission. The commission collected and submitted to the President of Ukraine more than 5000 signatures for the release of Yulia Tymoshenko, and other Ukrainian political prisoners.

In April 2015, he co-organized the Social Platform Everyone Matters with a program of socially oriented reforms.

In September 2014, he headed the Mykolaiv Regional Organization of the Batkivshchyna political party. In the same year, he organized the Prayer Group in the Verkhovna Rada of the VIII convocation.

From 2014 to 2017 he was the President of the Trident Foundation for the Advancement of Ukraine in Washington. In December 2014 he organized the visit of Jim Slattery, the President of the US Congressmen's Association to Kyiv as part of a campaign to protect the family estate of aircraft designer Igor Sikorsky and to create a museum there.

On October 25, 2015, he was elected a deputy of the Mykolaiv regional council from Batkivshchyna party. From November 2015 to September 2016 — First Deputy Chairman of the Mykolaiv Regional Council.

Sokolov has been a Member of the Chamber of Commerce and Industry of Ukraine since December 21, 2016. He was awarded the honors of the Ministry of Internal Affairs of Ukraine and the Ukrainian Orthodox Church.

Sokolov is the Chairman of the NGO Support Center of National Defense Capability of Ukraine since 2018.

As of 2021, he is deputy director of Ukrtranzit LLC.

Family 
His father is Volodymyr Sokolov, Hero of Socialist Labor, chief engineer of Yuzhmash from 1982 to 1987.

Mykhailo Sokolov is married and has five children.

See also 
 Batkivshchyna

References

External links 
 Opendatabot
 Dovidka.com.ua
 Verkhovna Rada of the VI convocation

All-Ukrainian Union "Fatherland" politicians
1967 births
Living people
Politicians from Dnipro
Oles Honchar Dnipro National University alumni
Sixth convocation members of the Verkhovna Rada